Gyarmati is a Hungarian surname. Notable people with the surname include:

Andrea Gyarmati (born 1954), Hungarian swimmer
Anna Gyarmati (born 1993), Hungarian snowboarder
Béla Gyarmati (born 1942), Hungarian fencer
Dezső Gyarmati (1927–2013), Hungarian water polo player
János Gyarmati (1910–1974), Hungarian footballer and manager
Olga Gyarmati (1924–2013), Hungarian athlete
Peter G. Gyarmati (born 1941), American computer scientist

Hungarian-language surnames